Lansing Redistribution Center (formerly, Lansing Service Parts Operation) is a General Motors automobile parts warehouse located in Delta charter Township, Michigan at West Mount Hope Highway and Lansing Road along GTW-operated railway. The   was originally constructed in 1959, opened in 1960 and expanded in 1964, 1965, 1969 and 1979.

It is the only General Motors warehouse that specializes in shipping parts in low demand.  It had 240  employees as of 2008.

As of 2022, the warehouse had 210 employees.

References

External links
 

General Motors factories
Economy of Lansing, Michigan
Motor vehicle assembly plants in Michigan
1959 establishments in Michigan